St. Mary is a home rule-class city in Marion County, Kentucky, in the United States. During the 2010 U.S. Census, the Saint Mary Division of Marion Co.  covering  around the city  had a population of 2,765.

History
The town was first known as Hardin's Creek when it was settled by the Hardin family . Catholic settlers from "Saint" Charles Co., Maryland, arrived in 1790. Their community was originally known as Saint Charles after their former home and new church.

The first Catholic settlers of the Hardin's creek settlement were the brothers Edward Beaven and Charles Beaven from Maryland in 1786, followed by the brothers Mathew, Zachariah, Sylvester, and Jeremiah Cissell.

The community was the birthplace and hometown of George Elder, who  along with William Byrne  later returned from seminary in Maryland to found Saint Mary's College in 1821. The post office was established in 1858 as Saint Mary's for the school. The city was incorporated as St. Mary on May 26, 1865. The college closed its doors in 1976.

The city includes historical markers honoring the Sisters of Loretto and St. Mary's College.

Geography
St. Mary is located on Kentucky Route 84 at  (37.580711, -85.346291), just west of Lebanon.

The United States Census Bureau does not recognize St. Mary as incorporated, although a census county division (CCD) exists surrounding it.

Demographics

Economy
Since 1980, St. Mary has been home to the 826-bed Marion Adjustment Center, a CCA-owned minimum- and medium-security facility. In June 2013, the Kentucky Department of Corrections elected not to renew the contract. At the time, the MAC employed 166 people.

Notes

References

Cities in Marion County, Kentucky
Census county divisions
Cities in Kentucky